1,2,3,6-Tetrahydrobenzaldehyde is an organic compound with the formula C6H9CHO.  This colorless liquid is formally a partially hydrogenated derivative of benzaldehyde.  It is produced by the Diels-Alder reaction of acrolein to butadiene.  It is of interest as a precursor to 3,4-epoxycyclohexylmethyl-3′,4′-epoxycyclohexane carboxylate, a useful resin and precursor to industrial coatings.  The conversion entails the Tishchenko reaction, i.e., base-catalyzed conversion to the ester followed by double epoxidation.

References

Aldehydes
Cyclohexenes